McMillan is a town in Marathon County, Wisconsin, United States. It is part of the Wausau, Wisconsin Metropolitan Statistical Area. The population was 1,968 at the 2010 census. The unincorporated community of McMillan is located in the town. A section of the Mead Wildlife Area is also located in the town.

Geography

Demographics
At the 2000 census there were 1,790 people, 611 households, and 521 families living in the town. The population density was 52.0 people per square mile (20.1/km). There were 631 housing units at an average density of 18.3 per square mile (7.1/km).  The racial makeup of the town was 98.10% White, 0.11% African American, 0.34% Native American, 1.12% Asian, and 0.34% from two or more races. Hispanic or Latino of any race were 0.17%.

Of the 611 households 45.0% had children under the age of 18 living with them, 78.2% were married couples living together, 4.3% had a female householder with no husband present, and 14.6% were non-families. 12.6% of households were one person and 5.4% were one person aged 65 or older. The average household size was 2.93 and the average family size was 3.20.

The age distribution was 30.0% under the age of 18, 5.6% from 18 to 24, 27.5% from 25 to 44, 28.9% from 45 to 64, and 8.0% 65 or older. The median age was 39 years. For every 100 females, there were 101.6 males. For every 100 females age 18 and over, there were 101.8 males.

The median household income was $59,342 and the median family income  was $62,400. Males had a median income of $35,688 versus $27,214 for females. The per capita income for the town was $27,161. About 1.1% of families and 2.1% of the population were below the poverty line, including 1.9% of those under age 18 and 6.2% of those age 65 or over.

Notable people

 Ben Lang, farmer, businessman, and politician, lived in the town

References

External links
Town of McMillan official website

Towns in Marathon County, Wisconsin
Towns in Wisconsin